Shabaab (Hindi: शबाब "youth") is a 1954 Bollywood movie. Made in the Hindi language and directed by M. Sadiq, it stars Bharat Bhushan and Nutan.

Cast
Bharat Bhushan
Nutan
Asant Kumar
Shyam Kumar
Badri Prasad
Yashodra Katju
Wasti

Music

Scored by Naushad and written by Shakeel Badayuni, the movie featured a soundtrack:
"Daya Kar He Giridhar Gopal" - Amir Khan - Raga Multani
"Mehlon Mein Rahne Wale" - Mohammed Rafi - Sahana (raga)
"Mar Gaye Ham Jeete Ji Malik" - Lata Mangeshkar - Tilang
"Bhagat Ke Bas Mein Hai Bhagwan" - Manna Dey
"Jogan Ban Jaungi Saiyan Tore Karan" - Lata Mangeshkar - Khamaj
"Lagi More Man Ki O Sajna" - Shamshad Begum
"Yehi Armaan Lekar Aaj Apne Ghar Se" - Mohammed Rafi - Tilang
"Jo Main Janti" - Lata Mangeshkar - Mand
"Man Ki Been Matwari Baje" - Mohammed Rafi, Lata Mangeshkar - Raga Bahar with a trace of Raga Basant
"Chandan Ka Palna Resham Ki Dori" - Lata Mangeshkar, Hemant Kumar - Pilu
"Aaye Na Balam Wada Karke" - Mohammed Rafi - Jogiya (raga)
"Marna Teri Gali Mein Jeena Teri Gali Mein" - Lata Mangeshkar - composition in Pahadi (raga)

References

External links

1954 films
1950s Hindi-language films
Films scored by Naushad
Indian romantic drama films
1954 romantic drama films
Indian black-and-white films
Films directed by M. Sadiq